Björn-Erik Höijer (14 March 1907 – 10 February 1996) was a Swedish novelist, short-story writer and playwright.

Biography
Björn-Erik Höijer was born at  Malmberget, Sweden. Originally a handicraft teacher (sloyd), Höijer made his literary debut in 1940 with the short-story collection Grått berg. Among his novels are Parentation from 1945 and Lavinen from 1961. Among his plays are Isak Juntti hade många söner from 1954 and En gruvarbetares död from 1990. He was awarded the Dobloug Prize in 1967. He died during 1996 and was buried at Uppsala gamla kyrkogård.

References

1907 births
1996 deaths
20th-century Swedish dramatists and playwrights
Dobloug Prize winners
20th-century Swedish novelists
Swedish male novelists
Swedish male dramatists and playwrights
Burials at Uppsala old cemetery
Sloyd
20th-century Swedish male writers